Whirlpool is a 1970 British-Danish exploitation thriller film written and directed by José Ramón Larraz, in his directorial debut, and starring Karl Lanchbury, Vivian Neves, and Pia Andersson.

Plot
Sarah, a middle-aged photographer, lives in the country outside London with Theo, an aspiring photographer whom she has taken in. The pair refer to one another as aunt and nephew, respectively. While at the studio, Sara meets Tulia, a young fashion model, whom she invites to come stay at her home so that Theo can photograph her. Tulia and Theo have a photo session in the woods, but it is aborted after Tulia witnesses a cloaked figure spying on her. The figure vanishes, and Tulia becomes frightened.

That evening, Tulia recounts to her hosts how her friend, Rhonda—also a model and acquaintance who spent time at Sarah's home—commented on being frightened while staying there. In particular, she was bothered by the nearby lake, which she found inexplicably ominous. Shortly after returning to London, Rhonda apparently vanished. As the night draws on, the three have drinks and play a game of cards, which culminates in Tulia and Sarah undressing. Theo and Tulia begin to kiss, and Sarah retires to her bedroom, where she stares longingly at photographs of Rhonda.

Tulia is tormented by nightmares involving Theo and Rhonda. In the morning, Sarah chastises Theo for not bringing Tulia into her room so that they could engage in a threesome. An inspector, Mr. Field, arrives and confronts Theo in search of Rhonda, who has disappeared. Theo claims Rhonda told him she planned to move to Italy after leaving Sarah's house. Theo brings Tulia to a local pub, where he offers a man a sum of money. Theo brings the man and Tulia to a secluded area in the woods and allows the man to initiate what is an apparent sexual assault on Tulia, as he photographs it. The man stops short of raping Tula, and, realizing that Theo staged this is a mere photo opportunity, Tulia is disgusted and demands to be returned to London.

Theo returns Tulia to the house, where Sarah calms her. Later that night, Sarah and Tulia have sex as Theo photographs it. This eventually culminates in a threesome. Meanwhile, Mr. Field cases Sarah's house, accidentally knocking over a bucket while attempting to look inside. The noise alerts Theo, who quickly goes outside to investigate. Theo chases Mr. Field into the woods to his car, where he stabs him to death.

While Theo disposes of Mr. Field's corpse, Sarah and Tulia are left alone, unaware of what has transpired. Sarah falls asleep, after which Tulia goes into the basement of the home to investigate Theo's darkroom. There, she uncovers disturbing photographs of Rhonda being raped and murdered by Theo, the man from the pub, and a tramp who resides in town. After killing Rhonda, the men disposed of her corpse in the lake. Theo returns to the house and confronts a horrified Tulia, confessing that he is a sadist. Just as he attempts to stab Tulia, she hits him with a developing tray and manages to flee the house, running into the woods. Theo eventually corners her, forcing her against a fallen tree, where he fondles and kisses her while viciously stabbing her to death.

Cast

Release

Critical response
Roger Ebert panned Whirlpool, deeming it a "genuinely sickening film. It has to do with various varieties of sex, yes, but its main appeal seems to be its violence...  The violence is not, however, the cathartic sort to be found in The Wild Bunch or the comic strip spaghetti Westerns. It's a particularly grisly sort of violence, photographed for its own sake and deliberately relishing in its ugliness. It made me awfully uneasy."

Home media
Whirlpool was unavailable in home media formats until it was released on Blu-ray as part of a three-film set of director Larraz's early features, entitled "Blood Hunger", by Arrow Films. The Blu-ray edition was sourced from a print held by the UCLA Film and Television Archive in Los Angeles.

Notes

References

External links
 
 
 

1970 films
1970 directorial debut films
1970s exploitation films
1970s thriller films
British exploitation films
British horror films
British LGBT-related films
British thriller films
Films about photographers
Films directed by José Ramón Larraz
Films set in country houses
1970s English-language films
1970s British films